The Empress of India is a former royal title.

It may also refer to:

 , the British pre-dreadnought battleship
 , the British dreadnought battleship
 , the Canadian passenger ships
 Empress of India Medal, a medal
 Empress of India, Queen Victoria (r. 1876–1901)
 A work by Frank Stella owned by the Museum of Modern Art